The Merchants and Farmers Bank Building is a historic two-story arched stone bank building constructed in 1903 in Okolona, Mississippi. It was listed on the National Register of Historic Places on May 14, 1987. It is located at 245 West Main Street. The building is an example of Richardsonian Romanesque architecture; the interior includes a tin coffered ceiling.

See also
National Register of Historic Places listings in Mississippi#Chickasaw County

References

Richardsonian Romanesque architecture in Mississippi
Bank buildings on the National Register of Historic Places in Mississippi
Commercial buildings completed in 1903
National Register of Historic Places in Chickasaw County, Mississippi